Cordylus meculae, the Mecula girdled lizard, is a third species from the Rhodesian girdled lizard complex, and was described from Mount Mecula in northern Mozambique. It lives in granite outcrops of montane grasslands and dry miombo woodland.  The nostril pierces the center of the nasal scale and the head shields are rugose.  The dorsal coloration is dark brown with paler infusions on the flanks. The head is almost black with yellow lips and scattered yellow flecks on the head and neck.  The belly is buff colored.

References 

Branch, B., 1998.  Field Guide to Snakes and other Reptiles of Southern Africa: Ralph Curtis Books Publishing, Sanibel Island, Florida, 399 p.

Branch, W. R., Rodel, M.-O., and Marais, J., 2005.  A new species of rupicolous Cordylus Laurenti 1768 (Sauria: Cordylidae) from Northern Mozambique: African Journal of Herpetology, 54(2): 131-138.  

Broadley, D. G., and Branch, W. R., 2002.  A review of the small east African Cordylus (Sauria: Cordylidae), with the description of a new species: African Journal of Herpetology, 51(1): 9-34.

Endemic fauna of Mozambique
Cordylus
Reptiles of Mozambique
Reptiles described in 2005
Taxa named by William Roy Branch